Wang Beiche (born 20 March 1995) is a Chinese singer.

Biography
Wang was born Wang Zhaodong in Mudanjiang, Heilongjiang, on March 20, 1995. He graduated from Harbin Normal University.

In 2017, he officially joined the Geluren Band and became the lead singer. That same year, he participated in the entertainment show Super Boy on Hunan Television, and was promoted to the top 100. In 2018, he chose to leave the Geluren Band. In July 2018, he released his first single, Trap. He starred opposite Ye Jiayin in the romantic comedy Goodbye, My Belle of Class.

Singles

Filmography

Film

References

External links

1995 births
People from Mudanjiang
Living people
Harbin Normal University alumni
Singers from Heilongjiang
Male actors from Heilongjiang
Chinese male film actors